MCSS is an initialism that may refer to:
Mannix College Students' Society, an organization at Mannix College (Monash University)
Master of Crop and Soil Science, a degree offered by the University of Georgia College of Agricultural and Environmental Sciences
Mathematics of Control, Signals, and Systems, an academic journal
Ministry of Community and Social Services (Ontario)
Mudgeeraba Creek State School